Sayyora Umarovna Sultanova (born 1937) was a Soviet-Uzbekistani politician (communist). She served as Minister of Social Security.

References

Living people
1937 births
20th-century Uzbekistani women politicians
20th-century Uzbekistani politicians
Soviet women in politics
Uzbekistani communists
Women government ministers of Uzbekistan